Typhoon Vamco, known in the Philippines as Typhoon Ulysses, was a powerful and very destructive Category 4-equivalent typhoon that struck the Philippines and Vietnam. It also caused the worst flooding in Metro Manila since Typhoon Ketsana in 2009. The twenty-second named storm and tenth typhoon of the 2020 Pacific typhoon season, Vamco originated as a tropical depression northwest of Palau, where it slowly continued its northwest track until it made landfall in Quezon. After entering the South China Sea, Vamco further intensified in the South China Sea until it made its last landfall in Vietnam.

Vamco made its first landfall in the Philippines near midnight on November 11 in the Quezon province as a Category 2-equivalent typhoon. The typhoon brought heavy rains in Central Luzon, and the nearby provinces, including Metro Manila, the national capital. Heavy rains caused by the typhoon overflowed rivers, causing severe flooding in Marikina. As the typhoon crossed the country, dams from all around Luzon neared their spilling points, forcing the dams to release large amounts of water into their impounds. As the Magat Dam approached its spilling point, all seven of its gates were opened to prevent dam failure, which overflowed the Cagayan River and caused widespread floods in Cagayan and Isabela. After entering the South China Sea, Vamco further intensified until it reached its brief peak as a Category 4-equivalent typhoon. On November 15, Vamco made landfall in Vietnam as a Category 1-equivalent typhoon before dissipating shortly after.

Days after the typhoon had passed the Philippines, rescue operations in the Cagayan Valley were still ongoing due to the unexpected extent of the flooding. In response to the typhoon's effects, the entire landmass of Luzon was placed under a state of calamity. As of December 2, the Philippines' National Disaster Risk Reduction and Management Council had stated that the typhoon had 112 casualties (including 102 validated deaths, and another 10 missing), and the damages caused by Vamco reached ₱20.2 billion (US$1.06 billion).

Meteorological history

At 12:00 UTC on the same day, the Philippine Atmospheric, Geophysical and Astronomical Services Administration (PAGASA) declared the system as a tropical depression inside of the Philippine Area of Responsibility (PAR), prompting the agency to identify it as Ulysses. The next day at 7:15 UTC, the system strengthened into a tropical storm, prompting JMA to identify the system as Vamco, with the Joint Typhoon Warning Center later issuing their first warning on the system as a tropical depression.
As the system tracked closer to southern Luzon, both the PAGASA and the JMA upgraded Vamco into a severe tropical storm. Vamco was then upgraded to typhoon status by the JMA on November 11, followed by the JTWC and the PAGASA shortly after. At 22:30 PHT (14:30 UTC) on November 11, Vamco made its first landfall on the island town of Patnanungan, Quezon. At 23:20 PHT (15:20 UTC) and at 1:40 PHT of the following day (17:40 UTC), Vamco made its next two Quezon landfalls over Burdeos (in Polillo Island) and General Nakar (in the Luzon landmass), respectively. Later, Vamco dropped below typhoon intensity inland. At 00:00 UTC, Vamco emerged over the South China Sea. The system left the PAR at 01:30 UTC as the PAGASA redeclared the system as a typhoon. Vamco gradually intensified in the South China Sea, before rapidly intensifying into its peak as a Category 4-equivalent typhoon on November 13. The typhoon then weakened before making its last landfall in Vietnam as a Category 1-equivalent typhoon on November 15. Shortly after, the typhoon weakened further into a tropical storm until it dissipated north of Laos.

Preparations

Philippines

As Vamco initially formed inside of the Philippine Area of Responsibility, the PAGASA immediately began issuing severe weather bulletins in preparation for the typhoon. The Philippines had recently been hit with three other tropical cyclones  Typhoon Molave (Quinta), Typhoon Goni (Rolly), and Tropical Storm Etau (Tonyo)  making this the fourth tropical cyclone to approach Luzon in the past month. After Goni damaged the PAGASA's Doppler weather radar station in Catanduanes, one of the only three stations in the country, typhoon tracking was done manually. The PAGASA first raised tropical cyclone wind signals as early as November 9. By 23:00 UTC on November 10, the PAGASA had raised a Signal #2 wind signal for 17 provinces, parts of 6 provinces, 2 islands, and the national capital region, Metro Manila. The National Disaster Risk Reduction Management Council (NDRRMC), also began sending out emergency alerts to mobile phone users about possible storm surges. The NDRRMC later used this same system to alert citizens in areas under Signal #3.

Residents in the Pollilo Islands and in Central Luzon were forced to evacuate a day before the storm's landfall. 14,000 residents were also to be evacuated in Camarines Norte. Bicol Region, one of the regions worst hit by Goni last month, evacuated 12,812 individuals ahead of the incoming storm. Over 2,071 passengers were stranded in ports in multiple regions of Luzon as sea conditions worsened. Philippine Airlines suspended flights due to the inclement weather brought by Vamco. The Office of the President of the Philippines suspended work in government offices and online classes in public schools in 7 regions, including the National Capital Region. 12 hours before the typhoon's landfall, the PAGASA raised Signal #3 warnings for areas to be hit by the typhoon on landfall including Metro Manila and the entirety of Central Luzon. The Philippine Institute of Volcanology and Seismology then issued lahar warnings for the Mayon Volcano, the Taal Volcano, and Mount Pinatubo hours prior to the typhoon's landfall. Prior to the typhoon's landfall, at least 231,312 individuals were evacuated by local government units.

Vamco struck while the Philippines was in the middle of the COVID-19 pandemic, and various sections of the country were under different community quarantines.

Vietnam

On November 14, at least 460,000 people were ordered to evacuate from the coastal areas by the government. On the morning of that same day, all flights in five airports, including Da Nang, Chu Lai, Phu Bai, Dong Hoi and Vinh were ordered to be suspended or delayed.

Impact 
Vamco impacted the Philippines and Vietnam just a few days after the strike of Typhoon Goni. Both countries were still attempting to recover from Goni's initial impact, but Vamco went on to quickly exceed Goni's record as the sixth-costliest Philippine typhoon on record; in total both typhoons caused ₱37.2 billion (US$770 million) in damage in the Philippines alone.

Philippines 

Even before the typhoon's landfall, Catanduanes had already experienced heavy rains, causing floods and rockslides in the province. Flood waters were reported to reach the roofs of some houses in Bagamanoc.

Several areas in Luzon, including Metro Manila, reported that they experienced power outages prior to the typhoon making landfall. The Philippine Stock Exchange was closed on November 12 due to the typhoon.

Emergency hotlines in some locations became unavailable because most emergency numbers provided by national agencies and local governments were landline phone numbers, which were difficult to call from mobile phones, and became totally inaccessible once telephone lines in the localities were brought down by the storm. The PAGASA's own phone lines went down due to technical problems on the morning of November 12, going back up a few hours later. Broadcast news coverage had been significantly reduced compared to typhoons in previous years as a result of the shutdown of the ABS-CBN broadcast network, which had local news bureaus and strong signal reach in provinces far from Manila. The shutdown caused an information gap among areas which could only receive the network's signals. Social media filled in some of the information gap, with some residents and even local governments treating it as a de facto emergency hotline.

In the early hours of November 12, local government officials began reporting that their local rescue capabilities were already overwhelmed, and that they needed help from the national government in the form of airlift support and help from the Philippine Coast Guard. After attending an online ASEAN summit that morning, Philippine President Rodrigo Duterte addressed the nation via a pre-taped broadcast on state-owned television network People's Television Network (PTV), saying that he wanted to visit the storm-hit constituencies, but that he was constrained by his security personnel and doctor from doing so because of the risk to his safety and health. Actor Jericho Rosales and digital creative Kim Jones resorted to using their surfboards to rescue stranded citizens in Marikina. 52 national roads in 7 regions were damaged due to the typhoon's effects.

As of January 13, 2021, the NDRRMC reported 98 deaths and 19 missing caused by Vamco. Economic loss in infrastructure were at  while damage to agriculture reached . The Cagayan Valley experienced the highest total amount of damage. At least 5,184,824 individuals were affected by the typhoon's onslaught. The Armed Forces of the Philippines and Philippine National Police reportedly rescued 265,339 and 104,850 individuals, respectively. Contrary to the NDRRMC's report, Marikina officials report an unofficial damage of ₱40 billion (US$824 million).

River floods 

The Marikina River surpassed the water levels reached by Typhoon Ketsana in 2009, which brought massive rainfall and caused severe flooding. Marikina Mayor Marcelino Teodoro declared the city under a state of calamity due the massive floods brought by the typhoon. Government scientists and advocacy sector conservationists warned that the flooding on the Marikina River was a consequence of the severe deforestation of the Upper Marikina River Watershed in Rizal province, where illegal logging, illegal quarrying, and landgrabbing continued to be a problem.

In Pampanga, 86 villages experienced flooding due to the swelling of the Pampanga River.

Dam overflow 
Dams in the affected areas, including La Mesa Dam, Angat Dam, Binga Dam, Magat Dam, Ipo Dam, and Caliraya Dam, reached their maximum levels on November 12, forcing them to begin releasing water.

Local governments continuously conducted rescue operations in their areas but had run out of equipment and manpower to rescue. Because there was very little media coverage of the flooding in the area, residents resorted to social media to request the national government for rescue. Waters under the Buntun Bridge went up as high as 13 meters, flooding the nearby barangays up to the roofs of houses. Rescue efforts continued into the early hours of November 14, but low visibility made aerial rescue efforts impossible until daylight. Cagayan and Isabela have since declared a state of calamity.

Following the severe flooding in the Cagayan Valley, experts called the valley the most flood-prone area in the country. The flood was caused by rain dumped by Typhoon Ulysses. The National Irrigation Administration was criticized for releasing water from the Magat Dam, which allegedly made the situation worse.

Vietnam 

Vamco began affecting Central Vietnam around midnight ICT on November 15. Strong winds downed many trees and damaged numerous homes in the four provinces from Hà Tĩnh to Thừa Thiên Huế. In Thuận An, Thừa Thiên Huế, strong waves lashed docked fishing ships and civilian houses. In the city of Da Nang, the storm surge destroyed many sea embankments, while washing rocks and debris onshore and into the streets. Power outages affected 411,252 people in six central provinces. A person was killed in Thừa Thiên-Huế Province, and economic loss in Quảng Bình Province reached 450 billion đồng (US$19.4 million).

Aftermath

Philippines 

Even after the typhoon had passed, widespread flooding from the typhoon's rains and from nearly overflowed dams wreaked havoc on the country days after its landfall. Despite causing heavy floods, according to the PAGASA, Vamco released less rain that Typhoon Ketsana, another typhoon in 2009 which caused similar floods. In response to the typhoon's effects, the entire landmass of Luzon was placed under a state of calamity.

Public reactions to government response 

Tuguegarao Mayor Jefferson Soriano drew criticism after a photo on social media showed him celebrating his birthday in Batangas while Tuguegarao was inundated by floods. Soriano regretted the trip, and stated that he underestimated the effects of the typhoon as no storm signals have were raised when he left for Batangas. Soriano attempted to return to Tuguegarao on November 12, a day after the typhoon's first landfall, however the North Luzon Expressway had already been blocked due to the typhoon. He has been ordered to explain his absence to the Department of the Interior and Local Government, according to the department spokesman.

Vice President Leni Robredo called for investigations after suspected oversights in disaster preparedness. Robredo stated that estimates on the possibility of flooding should be provided when a dam's gates are opened for public awareness. The House of Representatives of the Philippines has since filed for a probe into the circumstances which led to the severe flooding in Cagayan and Isabela.

Citizens on social media demanded accountability from the government, along with President Rodrigo Duterte, who had not made any appearance to the public during the typhoon's onslaught. Presidential Spokesperson Harry Roque later defended the president's whereabouts, citing that the president "is always on top of things." Roque denied shortcomings in preparation, however admitted that authorities "did not expect the gravity of the amount of water that descended on the lowlands." Roque also blamed multiple factors for the flooding, including climate change, deforestation, and illegal mining. Duterte also defended local government units in their disaster response measures.

As a result of the shutdown of the ABS-CBN broadcast network, an information gap was formed among remote areas which could only receive the network's signals. This was raised by citizens on social media, and by Robredo as well. Roque has since denied the existence of this gap.

In a televised briefing for the typhoon, Duterte made sex jokes on-air with other government executives, to the dismay of the public. Gabriela Women's Party representative Arlene Brosas criticized Duterte's audacity to make "inappropriate jokes when people literally drowned and died due to the series of calamities," and that the citizens needed an "effective leadership and a concrete plan." Roque defended Duterte's comments, saying that he was trying to "lighten the mood" after witnessing multiple consecutive tragedies and that the jokes were Duterte's way of coping with disasters.

Effects on education 
Due to the COVID-19 pandemic, the Department of Education (DepEd) required that classes be conducted through "modular learning", which involved the use of both online resources and printed self-learning materials dubbed "modules" for classes in public schools. While citizens evacuated from flooded areas, some students reported losing their modules due to the flood waters. DepEd Secretary Leonor Briones was heavily criticized for saying that schools should solve the problem of damaged modules on their own by drying the modules with the sun or a flat iron. The DepEd later stated that they will replace the damaged modules through additional funds provided by its central office.

In the aftermath of the typhoon, beginning November 15, some universities in the Philippines, including the Ateneo de Manila University, De La Salle University, Polytechnic University of the Philippines, and University of Santo Tomas, eased the academic workload for their students. Synchronous sessions through online videoconferencing were temporarily suspended, and deadlines for requirements were moved to succeeding weeks.

The Pasig government suspended classes from preschool to senior high school in both public and private schools for November 16 and 17. Quezon City officials also declared the suspension of online classes from kinder to senior high school on the same days. Marikina, after experiencing massive floods across the entire city, suspended classes in all levels until December 16.

Retirement
During the season, the PAGASA announced that Ulysses had withdrawn from their naming lists, as damage to infrastructure and agriculture exceeded ₱1 billion, and more than 101 people died. In January 2021, PAGASA picked Upang to supersede Ulysses for the 2024 season.

After the season, the Typhoon Committee announced that the name Vamco would be removed from the naming lists. In 2022, Bang-Lang was selected as the replacement for Vamco.

See also

 Other tropical cyclones named Vamco
 Other tropical cyclones named Ulysses
 Weather of 2020
 Tropical cyclones in 2020
 Typhoon Patsy (1970) – Notable late-season typhoon that took a similar track in November 1970
 Typhoon Xangsane (2006) – Devastated Metro Manila and also had a similar wind strength to Vamco
 Typhoon Ketsana (2009)
 Typhoon Conson (2010) – A deadly Category 1 typhoon that took a similar track
 Typhoon Nari (2013) – A powerful typhoon which struck Central Luzon area and also had a similar destructive wind strength
 Tropical Storm Fung-wong (2014) – Similar situation to Ketsana and Vamco
Typhoon Kammuri (2019) – impacted the Philippines at a similar time of year and caused widespread damage

References

External links

25W.VAMCO from the U.S. Naval Research Laboratory

2020 Pacific typhoon season
2020 disasters in the Philippines
2020 in Vietnam
Duterte administration controversies
November 2020 events in Asia
Retired Philippine typhoon names
Tropical cyclones in 2020
Typhoons in the Philippines